Balea perversa, also known as the wall snail or tree snail, is a species of air-breathing land snail, a terrestrial pulmonate gastropod mollusk in the family Clausiliidae, the door snails. The shell of this species is left-handed in coiling and it looks like a juvenile of a clausiliid.

Balea perversa (as its synonymous name Pupa fragilis) is the type species of the genus Balea.

Distribution
Balea perversa is widely distributed in western and central Europe east to Ukraine and westernmost Russia:

 British Isles: Great Britain and Ireland
 Western Europe
 Switzerland – lower concern in Switzerland
 Portugal
 Germany – vulnerable in Germany, endangered in Bavaria 
 Austria – vulnerable in Austria 
 Czech Republic
 Slovakia
 on an islet near Estonia
 Sicilia
 Sardinia
 Iceland
 in Scandinavia only coastal above 62° N

It was referred from Crimea, but it was probably Mentissa gracilicosta.

 Description 
The shell is small and resembles that of a juvenile clausilid. The color is pale brownish and the surface is often silky shiny. The shell often has distinct riblets. The apical whorls are cylindrical. The shell has 8-9 whorls and (unlike many clausiliids) the last whorl has the largest diameter. It is densely ribbed. The cervix is almost without keel. Apart from a rudimentary parietal fold, there are no folds in the aperture. This species has no clausilium.

The width of the shell is 2.5–2.7 mm; the height of the shell is 7–10 mm.Balea perversa differs from Balea sarsii in that it is a less slender and brownish rather than yellowish shell; the first whorl increases in diameter less rapidly,  and the sculpture is more prominently striated (with what are usually distinct riblets rather than coarse growth lines).

 Ecology Balea perversa'' lives on mosses and at the bark of trees, also near roads, at walls and rocky slopes, at rocks, less commonly in ground litter. It lives often on surfaces encrusted with lichens and other epiphytes. It prefers trees with rough bark. It prefers shady habitats in Portugal. It may tolerate non-calcareous soils. In Bulgaria it lives up to 1,600 m or perhaps to 2,400 m; in Switzerland up to 2,000 m.

It is easily dispersed by birds.

It feeds on mosses, algae, lichens, and cyanobacteria.

It is ovoviviparous, self-fertilization predominates, even in laboratories when snails are kept in pairs. Animals can reach maturity after 3–4 months under favourable conditions, one adult can give birth to 10-20 juveniles per year. Animals can also be active in mild winters.

It is locally threatened by too thorough and too frequent restorations of old buildings, acid rains, air pollution and cutting of old trees. It has largely disappeared from inside cities. Remains frequent in Ireland, but many colonies in lowland England have certainly disappeared, extinct around London since the 1920s.

References
This article incorporates public domain text from the reference

External links 

Balea perversa at Animalbase
Balea perversa  images at Encyclopedia of Life

Clausiliidae
Molluscs of Europe
Gastropods described in 1758
Taxa named by Carl Linnaeus